Geocrinia leai, sometimes called Lea's frog, is a species in the taxonomic family, Myobatrachidae and is endemic to southwest Australia.
As with the other species in the genera, Geocrinia, it is restricted to the high rainfall region at the south west of Western Australia; the very same Walpole/Nornalup district occupied by cogenor Geocrinia lutea. Ecology is similar to that of Geocrinia rosea, part of the so-called 'roseate complex'.

References

Geocrinia
Amphibians of Western Australia
Taxonomy articles created by Polbot
Amphibians described in 1898
Frogs of Australia
Taxa named by Joseph James Fletcher
Endemic fauna of Southwest Australia
Warren bioregion